702 is the self-titled second studio album by American R&B group of the same name. It was released on June 15, 1999, by Motown.

The album peaked at number thirty-four on the Billboard 200 chart. By November 2002, it was certified platinum in sales by the RIAA, after sales exceeding 1,000,000 copies in the United States.

Critical reception

Stephen Thomas Erlewine at AllMusic was critical of the album's running time and felt it was padded with some filler songs; however, he did call the work "a true step forward for 702." Paul Verna from Billboard praised the albums material and thought the group did a good job delivering an album "full of satisfying, hip-shaking tracks, not just a few radio-friendly singles".   Beth Johnson from Entertainment Weekly was mixed in her review although she thought the album was "cannily polished" due to its writers and producers, she declared it's "hard to distinguish" 702 "from the swelling tsunami of R&B girl groups".

Commercial performance
The album peaked at thirty-four on the U.S. Billboard 200 and reached the seventh spot on the R&B Albums chart. The album was certified gold in September 1999, and reached platinum status in November 2002.

Track listing

Credits and personnel
Information taken from Discogs.
bass – Everett "Jam" Benton, Jay Rakes, Romeo Williams
drums – Everett "Jam" Benton
executive production – Bruce Carbone, Billy Gray, Kedar Massenburg
guitar – Mats Berntoft, Eric Jackson, Joshua Thompson
keyboards – Everett "Jam" Johnson
mixing – Mick Guzauski, Manny Marroquin, Dave Pensado
production – Bag, Warryn "Smiley" Campbell, Greg Charley, Dutch, Jany, Marc Kinchen, Missy Elliott, PI & Jam, Rapture Stewart, Eric Seats, Soulshock & Karlin, Maurice Wilcher
recording – Anders Bagge, Jan Fairchild, Fredrick Sarhagen
synthesizer – Everett "Jam" Benton
vocals (background) – 702
writing – A. Bagge, L. Bagge, E. Benton, R. Cousin, P. Gadget, J. Guendon, E. Jackson, L. Kafi, C. Loving, E. Atkins - Campbell, T. Atkins - Campbell

Charts

Weekly charts

Year-end charts

Certifications

References

External links
 
 

1999 albums
702 (group) albums
Albums produced by Missy Elliott
Albums produced by Soulshock and Karlin
Albums produced by Warryn Campbell
Motown albums